"Ready 'n' Steady" is a song written by American musicians D. A. Lucchesi and Jim Franks, and performed by the group D. A. The song appeared on Billboard magazine's Bubbling Under the Hot 100 chart for three weeks in June 1979; however, for many years neither the record nor any information about it or the artist could be found. This led many collectors to label "Ready 'n' Steady" a "phantom record" that did not exist at all. A recording surfaced in 2016 and its artist was identified.

On the Billboard Bubbling Under chart
The June 16, 1979 issue of Billboard listed 10 songs on its Bubbling Under Hot 100 Singles chart, a chart which lists songs ranking just below entry onto its main chart, the Billboard Hot 100. One of these was "Ready 'n' Steady" by D.A., listed at the number six position. The record, listed as being released on the Rascal label, moved up to number three on June 23, then up to two the following week before falling from the chart.

Whitburn's research
Music historian Joel Whitburn, whose company Record Research Inc. specializes in researching the Billboard charts, has published various books containing chart data. He has collected tens of thousands of records, including all of the 45s ever to hit the Hot 100 or Bubbling Under charts—all except "Ready 'n' Steady".

In a 1995 interview, Whitburn said he had never actually seen or heard the record, but added, "We think—we think—that it's a girl's rock group from Chicago. Punk group, we think—1979. And we think that the Rascal label was out of a guy's home in Detroit." Whitburn had found a small ad for a Rascal label located in Detroit in a punk rock publication and had the address checked out; unfortunately, all that was found was a boarded-up vacant house. The entry in Billboard shows "Ready 'n' Steady" had a catalog number of 102; if there was a Rascal 101 released, it remains unknown to collectors.

In the fourth edition of Whitburn's Bubbling Under the Hot 100 book, published in 2005, the entry for "D. A." was amended with a note stating, "The existence of this record and artist is in question", and quotes a price of $150 as its value; in 2009, Whitburn published his latest Top Pop Singles book, which includes both Hot 100 and Bubbling Under singles—but D. A. was not listed at all. In an interview with the website CelebrityAccess, Whitburn noted he still had not been able to find "Ready 'n' Steady" and said, "I don't think it exists". Whitburn also thought that the song's listing on the chart could have been a copyright trap by Billboard.

The 2002 16th edition of Jerry Osbourne's Official Price Guide to Records listed the record, with a value of $75–125, along with an unnamed LP on the Frontline label, dated 1985 or 1986. This is actually the album Fearful Symmetry by the Christian rock band Daniel Amos, which sometimes used the abbreviation "D.A.".

Resurfacing
The United States Copyright Office catalog contains a registration of a song titled "Ready & Steady" with authorship credited to D. A. Lucchesi and Jim Franks; it was registered on September 16, 1986 with a creation date of 1979. Dennis Armand "D. A." Lucchesi (June 5, 1945 – August 18, 2005) was a California-based mortgage broker and part-time musician who performed locally as "D. A. and the Dukes."

In 2016, further investigation into this copyright registration by Paul Haney, of Record Research Inc., led to co-author Jim Franks, who provided Haney with a recording of the song. According to Haney, the song was recorded but never pressed as a vinyl record or offered for sale. As for how it appeared on the charts without any records for sale or any airplay, according to Haney, a record promoter with a major label took an interest in the band and somehow managed to get the song listed on the Billboard chart; this makes "Ready 'n' Steady" the only song ever to appear on any Billboard listing without actually being commercially released. The Rascal label, at that time, existed only on paper and was owned by a relative of one of the band members; in 1984, Rascal (based in Hollywood) would issue a few independent singles, though nothing by D.A.

"Ready 'n' Steady" was probably never played on the radio until Haney appeared on the Crap from the Past radio show on KFAI in Minneapolis, Minnesota on July 8, 2016, during which the recording was aired.

See also
"The Most Mysterious Song on the Internet"

References

External links

1979 songs
Rediscovered works